The Thomas House on rural Louisiana Highway 787 near Martin in Red River Parish, Louisiana, is a historic house built around 1855.  It was listed on the National Register of Historic Places in 2002.

It is a log house built originally with a single pen, which was expanded by a frame addition later. The original log section is well-preserved, and is of fairly fine work, with squared logs joined by half-dovetail notching.

It is significant as a rare surviving example of domestic log construction by the Scots-Irish/Appalachian
Uplanders who settled northern Louisiana in the 1830s.

References

Houses on the National Register of Historic Places in Louisiana
Red River Parish, Louisiana
Log houses
Houses completed in 1855